{{DISPLAYTITLE:C24H28O2}}
The molecular formula C24H28O2 (molar mass: 348.48 g/mol, exact mass: 348.2089 u) may refer to:

 Bexarotene (Targretin)
 Perrottetinene
 SC-4289

Molecular formulas